Kieler Sportvereinigung Holstein von 1900 e.V., simply as KSV Holstein or Kieler SV Holstein, commonly known as Holstein Kiel, is a German association football and sports club based in the city of Kiel, Schleswig-Holstein. From the 1900s through the 1960s the club was one of the most dominant sides in northern Germany. Holstein appeared regularly in the national playoffs, capturing their most important title, the German football championship in 1912, and finishing as vice-champions in 1910 and 1930. Holstein also won six regional titles and finished as runners-up another nine times. They remained a first-division side until the formation of the Bundesliga in 1963.

History

Foundation to WWII
Holstein Kiel is the product of the merger of predecessor sides Kieler Fußball-Verein von 1900 and Kieler Fußball-Club Holstein. The earliest of these two sides was Kieler Fußball-Verein (later 1. KFV) established on 7 October 1900 out of the membership of the gymnastics club Kieler Männerturnvereins von 1844. The club was not very successful and never loomed large in football generally. Later the club concentrated on track and field athletics.

Kieler Fußball-Club Holstein was formed on 4 May 1902 and was renamed Fußball-Verein Holstein von 1902 (FV Holstein Kiel) sometime in 1908. The club quickly became competitive and in 1910 they reached the German championship final where they lost 0–1 in extra time to Karlsruher FV. In 1912 they captured the German championship with a 2–1 overtime semi-final victory over defending champions Viktoria 89 Berlin followed by a 1–0 win in the final over the previous year's champions, Karlsruher FV. In 1914, the club renamed again after the new branches of hockey and athletics were added, becoming Sportverein Holstein von 1902.

On 7 June 1917, 1. Kieler Fussball Verein von 1900 and Sportverein Holstein von 1902, severely weakened by World War I, merged to form the current day club. As is common practice in Germany, the new association adopted the foundation date of the older club, while taking up the ground, kit, colours, logo and the name Holstein from SV Holstein Kiel. Through the 1920s, the team made regular appearances in the national playoffs and in 1926 reached the semi-finals where they were eliminated 1–3 by SpVgg Greuther Fürth. In 1930, they played their way to the final, losing 4–5 to Hertha BSC. The following year they reached the semi-finals where they were eliminated 0–2 by TSV 1860 Munich.

Under the Third Reich, German football was re-organized into sixteen top flight divisions. Kiel played in the Gauliga Nordmark and consistently delivered solid top-five finishes, but were frustrated in their pursuit of a division title. In 1942, the Gauliga Nordmark was broken up into the Gauliga Hamburg and Gauliga Schleswig-Holstein. No longer in the company of Hamburger SV and other strong teams from the city, Kiel immediately captured the title of the new division and defended it over the next two seasons until the end of World War II brought play to a halt across the country.

Those titles earned Kiel entry into the national playoff rounds. They made their best run in 1943 when they advanced as far as the semi-finals before being put out by eventual champions Dresdner SC. The team captured third place by defeating FC Vienna Wien. The next year, they were eliminated early on and no final was played in 1945.

Postwar to present

Since the end of the war, Kiel has primarily been a tier II and III club. After the conflict football in the western half of the country was re-organized into five regional top flight divisions. Holstein Kiel played from 1947 until 1963 in the Oberliga Nord (I) and twice finished as runners-up (1953, 1957). In 1961 the reserve team captured the German amateur championship. After the 1963 formation of a single national first division known as the Bundesliga, the club became a second division side and played in the Regionalliga Nord (II). Kiel failed in its attempt to advance to the Bundesliga after its 1965 Regionalliga Nord championship. German football was restructured in 1974 with the formation of a new second division known as the 2. Bundesliga and the team slipped to third division play in the Amateuroberliga Nord (III). Holstein Kiel won promotion to second tier competition in 1978 as part of the 2. Bundesliga Nord and was relegated in 1981.

With the reunification of Germany in 1990 teams from the former East Germany became part of a combined national competition. German football was re-organized again in 1994 and Holstein Kiel qualified for the new tier three division Regionalliga Nord (III). In 1996 the club was relegated for the first time to the Oberliga Hamburg/Schleswig-Holstein (IV) and returned to Regionalliga Nord (III) in 1998. They were relegated again to the Oberliga Hamburg/Schleswig-Holstein (IV) after failing to qualify for the restructured Regionalliga (III) which went from four divisions to two. They did advance the next year and narrowly missed promotion to the 2. Bundesliga in the 2005–06 season. By 2007 they had slipped to the Oberliga Nord (IV), but earned two consecutive promotions to reach the new 3. Liga (III) in 2009. After one year in the third division the club were relegated again in the Regionalliga Nord (IV). The team reached the quarter-finals of the 2011–12 DFB-Pokal, after beating FC Energie Cottbus, MSV Duisburg and 1. FSV Mainz 05. In the quarter-final they lost to Borussia Dortmund 4–0. Since 2013 the club played again in the third division and in 2017 they were promoted after 36 years to the second division. In the 2017–18 2. Bundesliga, after Holstein Kiel finished in 3rd place as the highest-scoring team with 71 goals, they lost 4–1 on aggregate to Wolfsburg in the relegation play-offs. In 2019, the club entered an official partnership with American USL League Two club San Francisco Glens SC. The team reached the semi-finals of the 2020–21 DFB-Pokal after beating Bayern Munich in the second round.

In the 2020–21 2. Bundesliga, Holstein Kiel missed the chance of direct promotion to the Bundesliga by losing the last two matches in the league by the same score 3–2 against Karlsruher SC and SV Darmstadt 98, to finish in third place behind VfL Bochum and Greuther Fürth. However, in the promotion play-off, they won the first away match 1–0 against FC Köln, but they lost the home second leg 5–1 to miss another chance of promotion.

Honours

National titles
 German Championship
 Champions: 1912
 Runners-up: 1910, 1930
 German Cup
 Semi-finals: 1941, 2021
 Quarter-finals: 1943, 2012
 Round of 16: 1962, 1966, 1971, 1979, 2019

Regional
 Northern German football championship (I)
 Champions: 1910, 1911, 1912, 1926, 1927, 1930
 Runners-up: 1914, 1922, 1923, 1928, 1929, 1931, 1932
 Gauliga Nordmark (I)
 Runners-up: 1937
 Gauliga Schleswig-Holstein (I)
 Champions: 1943, 1944
 Regionalliga Nord (II)
 Champions: 1965
 Oberliga Hamburg/Schleswig-Holstein (IV)
 Champions: 1998, 2001
 Oberliga Nord (IV)
 Champions: 2008
 Regionalliga Nord (IV)
 Champions: 2009, 2013
 Schleswig-Holstein Cup (Tiers III-IV)
 Winners: 1978, 1983, 1991, 1994, 1996, 2002, 2003, 2005, 2007, 2008, 2011, 2014, 2017

Reserve team
 German amateur championship
 Champions: 1961
 Schleswig-Holstein-Liga
 Champions: 1961, 1994, 2002, 2008, 2009, 2010
 Schleswig-Holstein Cup
 Winners: 1961, 1962, 1966

order: (league/achievement/tier/year)

Recent seasons
The recent season-by-season performance of the club:

Holstein Kiel

Holstein Kiel II

With the introduction of the Regionalligas in 1994 and the 3. Liga in 2008 as the new third tier, below the 2. Bundesliga, all leagues below dropped one tier.

Key

League history
Since 1947
 1947–63 Oberliga Nord (I)
 1963–74 Regionalliga Nord (II)
 1974–78 Amateuroberliga Nord/Oberliga Nord (III)
 1978–81 2. Bundesliga Nord (II)
 1981–94 Amateuroberliga Nord/Oberliga Nord (III)
 1994–96 Regionalliga Nord (III)
 1996–98 Oberliga Hamburg/Schleswig-Holstein (IV)
 1998–00 Regionalliga Nord (III)
 2000–01 Oberliga Hamburg/Schleswig-Holstein (IV)
 2001–07 Regionalliga Nord (III)
 2007–08 Oberliga Nord (IV)
 2008–09 Regionalliga Nord (IV)
 2009–10 3. Liga (III)
 2010–13 Regionalliga Nord (IV)
 2013–17 3. Liga (III)
 2017– 2. Bundesliga (II)

Players

Current squad

Out on loan

Notable famous or former players

Germany international footballers

Players which achieve during their active years at Holstein Kiel to become Germany international footballers. In parenthesis (games / goals/ years).

Women's section
Since July 2004 the club has a women's football section as Wittenseer SV-TUS Felde dissolved their club to join Holstein Kiel. The team play since 2005–06 in the 2. Bundesliga. 2011 the team were relegated to the third division and became from a sporting perspective a yo-yo club since that.

Recent seasons

Other departments
Other departments are team handball (Men and Women), Tennis, and Cheerleading. The women's handball team won the 1971 German handball championship.

References

External links

Abseits Guide to German Soccer

 
Football clubs in Germany
Football clubs in Schleswig-Holstein
Association football clubs established in 1900
Sport in Kiel
1900 establishments in Germany
2. Bundesliga clubs
3. Liga clubs